The Carmelite Church is a Ukrainian Greek Catholic parish church in Lviv. The church building was first mentioned in 1634 as the church of a Barefoot Carmelite monastery. In 1748 it was the scene of a notorious scuffle ("monomachia") between the Carmelites and their neighbours, the Capuchins. 

The suburban location caused the church to be rather well fortified, yet it was ravaged by the Cossacks in the Khmelnytsky Revolt and the Swedes in the Great Northern War. The entire façade was redesigned in the 19th century. 

Still, the building retains much of its original character and design, attributed to architect Jan Pokorowicz. Especially noteworthy are the 300-year-old black marble altar and a series of frescoes executed by Giuseppe Pedretti in the 1730s.

After 1789 the church has passed through a succession of owners. The Ukrainian Greek Catholic Church, an Eastern Catholic sui iuris church  in the Catholic Church, currently operates the building, which reconsecrated the church under the patronage of Michael the Archangel in 1991.

References 

 Островский Г. С. Львов. Издание второе, переработанное и дополненное. Ленинград: Искусство, 1975. С.113.
 Памятники градостроительства и архитектуры Украинской ССР. Киев: Будивельник, 1983—1986. Том 3, с. 78.

Churches in Lviv
Carmelite churches in Ukraine